The 2009 Vattenfall Cyclassics is a one-day road race, which is part of the 2009 UCI ProTour, took place on 16 August 2009.

Results

External links
 2009 Vattenfall Cyclassics

Vattenfall Cyclassics
Vattenfall Cyclassics, 2009
Vattenfall
2009